The 1998–99 Nationalliga B season was the 52nd season of the Nationalliga B, the second tier level of ice hockey in Switzerland. 11 teams participated in the league, and EHC Chur won the championship and were promoted to Nationalliga A. HC Martigny were relegated due to financial reasons.

Regular season

Playoffs

External links
 Championnat de Suisse 1998/99
 EliteProspects.com

1998–99 in Swiss ice hockey
Swiss